Khvosh Makan (also romanized as Khvosh Makān and Khowsh Makān; also known as Khosh Makān) is a village in Khafri Rural District, in the Central District of Sepidan County, Fars Province, Iran. At the 2006 census, its population was 114, in 18 families.

References 

Populated places in Sepidan County